Sakpu is an Mbum language of southern Chad.

References

Sources
Roger Blench, 2004. List of Adamawa languages (ms)

Languages of Chad
Mbum languages